The 12m² Sharpie was a sailing event in the sailing program of the 1956 Summer Olympics, held on Port Phillip. Seven races were scheduled. Twenty-six sailors, on 13 boats, from 13 nations competed.

The races were held on a 10 nautical mile (18.5 km) course. Dutch teams dominated this class in the 1950s, but they boycotted the 1956 Olympics, protesting the Soviet invasion of Hungary. Australia initially won the final, but were demoted to second place after France argued that Australian boat obstructed their path.

Results 

DNF = Did Not Finish, DNS= Did Not Start, DSQ = Disqualified 
 = Male,  = Female

Daily standings

Conditions on Port Phillip 
Three race areas were needed during the Olympics in the Port Phillip. Each of the classes was using the same scoring system. The northern course was used for the 12m² Sharpie.

Notes

References 
 
 
 

12m2 Sharpie
12m² Sharpie